Le Cordon Bleu College of Culinary Arts Minneapolis/Saint Paul was founded in 1999. The college is owned by Career Education Corporation under a licensing agreement with Le Cordon Bleu in Paris. It closed in 2017 along with all other Le Cordon Bleu colleges in the United States in the wake of changing federal loan guidelines.

History 
Le Cordon Bleu College of Culinary Arts was founded by Brown College in 1999. The school began offering a Le Cordon Bleu Culinary Program that year, the first to be offered in North America. It started as a Certificate Program and began offering Associate in Applied Science degrees in 2002. An Associate in Applied Science in Patisserie & Baking was added the following year. These programs were strictly offered through Brown College until 2005.

In 2005, the Brown College degree programs were transformed into a new institution: Le Cordon Bleu College of Culinary Arts Minneapolis/St. Paul. The school is a branch campus of Western Culinary Institute in Portland, Oregon.

References

External links 
 Le Cordon Bleu College of Culinary Arts Minneapolis/St. Paul

Defunct private universities and colleges in Minnesota
Cooking schools in the United States
Educational institutions established in 1999
Education in Dakota County, Minnesota
1999 establishments in Minnesota
2017 disestablishments in Minnesota
Career Education Corporation
Educational institutions disestablished in 2017